Wet nanotechnology (also known as wet nanotech) involves working up to large masses from small ones.

Wet nanotechnology requires water in which the process occurs. The process also involves chemists and biologists trying to reach larger scales by putting together individual molecules. While Eric Drexler put forth the idea of nano-assemblers working dry, wet nanotech appears to be the likely first area in which something like a nano-assembler may achieve economic results. Pharmaceuticals and bioscience are central features of most nanotech start-ups. Richard A.L. Jones calls nanotechnology that steals bits of natural nanotechnology and puts them in a synthetic structure biokleptic nanotechnology. He calls building with synthetic materials according to nature's design principles biomimetic nanotechnology.

Using these guiding principles could lead to trillions of nanotech robots, that resemble bacteria in structural properties, entering a person's blood stream to do medical treatments.

Background

Wet nanotechnology is an anticipated new sub-discipline of nanotech that is going to mostly be dominated by the different forms of wet engineering. The processes that will be used are going to take place in aqueous solutions and are very close to that of biotechnology manufacturing / bio-molecular manufacturing which is largely concerned with the production of biomolecules like proteins and DNA/RNA. There is some overlap of Biotechnology and Wet nanotechnology because living things are inherently bottom-up engineered and any exploitation of this by biotechnologists means they dabble in bottom-up engineering (though mostly at the level of producing macromolecules like proteins and nucleic acids from there monomer units. Wet nanotech, however, seeks to analyse living things and their components as engineering systems and aims to understand them completely to have complete control of the behavior of the system and to derive principles and methods that can be applied more broadly to bottom up manufacturing, to manipulate matter on the atomic and molecular scales and to creating machines or devices at the nanometer and microscopic scales. Biotech is mostly about exploiting living systems in any way possible. Molecular Biology and related disciplines compare the mechanism of function of proteins in particular - and nucleic acids to a lesser extent - as like "molecular machines". In order for engineers to mimic these nanoscale machines in a way that they could be produced with some efficiency, they must look into bottom-up manufacturing. Bottom-up manufacturing deals with manipulating individual atoms during the manufacturing process, so that there is absolute control of their placement and interactions.

Then from the atomic scale, nanomachines could be made and even be designed to self-replicate themselves as long as they are designed in an environment with copious amount of the needed materials. Because individual atoms are being manipulated in the process, bottom-up manufacturing is often referred to as “atom by atom” manufacturing. If the manufacturing of nanomachines can be made more readily available through improved techniques, there could be a large economic and social impact. This would start with improvements in making microelectromechanical systems and then would allow for the creation of nanoscale biological sensors along with things that have not been thought of yet. This is because “wet” nanotech is only in the beginning of its life. Scientists and engineers alike feel that biomimetics is a great way to start looking at creating nanoscale machines. Humans have only had a few thousand years to try to learn about the mechanics of things at really small scales. However, nature has been working on perfecting the design and functionality of nanomachines for millions of years. This is why there are already nanomachines, such as ATP synthase, working in our bodies that have an unheard of 95% efficiency.

“Wet” vs. “Dry”

Wet nanotechnology is a form of wet engineering as opposed to dry engineering. There are different fields that deal with those two types of engineering. Biologists, from the point of view of nanotechnology, deal with wet engineering. They study processes that happen in life, and for the most part those processes take place in aqueous environments. Our bodies are made up mostly of water.

Electrical and mechanical engineers are on the other side of the line in dry engineering. They are involved with processes and manufacturing that does not occur in aqueous environments.

For the most part, wet engineering deals with “soft” materials that allow for flexibility which is vital at the nanoscale in biological manufacturing. Dry engineers mostly handle things with rigid structures and parts. These differences stem for the fact that the forces that the two types of engineers must deal with are very different. At a larger scale, most things are dominated by Newtonian physics. However, when one looks at the nanoscale, especially in biological matters, the dominating force is Brownian motion.

Because nanotechnology in the new age is going to most likely deal with both dry and wet in conjunction with each other, there is going to have to be a change in the way society looks at engineering and manufacturing. People will have to be not only well educated in engineering but also in biology because the integration of the two is how there will be the largest improvements in nanotechnology.

Brownian Motion as it relates to Wet Nanotech

With the existence of natural nanomachines, “a complex precision microscopic-sized machine that fits the standard definition of a machine”, such as ATP synthase and T4 bacteriophage, scientists and biologists know that they are capable of making similar types of machines at the same scale. However, nature has had a long time to perfect the building and creation of these nanomachines and humankind has only just begun to look into them with greater interest.

This interest may have been sparked because of the existence of nanomachines such as ATP synthase (adenosine triphosphate), which is the “second in importance only to DNA”. ATP is the main energy converter that our bodies contain and without it, life as we know it would not be able to flourish or even survive.

What does Brownian motion have to do with complex nanomachines?

Brownian motion is a random, constantly fluctuating force that acts on a body in environments that are at a microscale. This force is one that mechanical engineers and physicists are not used to dealing with because, at the larger scale that humankind tends to think of things, this force is not one that needs to be taken into account. People think of gravity, inertia, and other physics based forces that act on us all the time, however at the nanoscale those forces are mostly “negligible”.

In order for nanomachines to be recreated by humans, either there will need to be discoveries that allow us to understand how to “exploit” Brownian motion as nature does or find a way to work around it by using materials that are rigid enough to stand up to these forces. The way that nature has been able to exploit Brownian motion is through self-assembly. This force pushes and pulls all of the proteins and amino acids around in our bodies and sticks them together in all sorts of combinations. The combinations that do not work separate and continue with their random attachment however, the combinations that do work produce things like ATP synthase. Through this process nature has been able to make a nanomachine that is 95% efficient, which is a feat that humans have not been able to accomplish yet. This is all because nature does not try to work around the forces; it uses them at its advantage.

Growing cells in culture to take advantage of their internal chemical synthesis machinery can be considered a form of nanotechnology but this machinery has also been manipulated outside of living cells.

References

Nanotechnology